Rail Professional is a monthly UK rail news magazine covering the business side of rail transport in Great Britain. Published by Rail Professional Ltd, the magazine is available free of charge to managers of UK train operating companies and Network Rail or by subscription to non-qualifying readers.

Currently in its seventh edition, Rail Professional also publishes an annual guidebook to the United Kingdom's rail industry. The reference book provides up to date information on all the major train operating companies and light rail and tram networks across the country as well as a complete source for products and services from a rail supply chain of around 3,500 firms.

History and profile
Rail Professional was established in 1996. The magazine was launched soon after the privatization of British Rail, with the aim of creating a forum for managers to communicate across the industry and stay updated on developments in other companies. Under British Rail, managers met regularly with their counterparts across the UK, but the fragmentation of the railways into separate train operating companies made it harder for managers to remain up-to-date on developments outside of their own organization. Rail Professional, launched by former British Rail manager Andrew Goodman, aimed to fill this gap.

Content 
Rail Professional covers rail news from train operating companies, Network Rail, the Department for Transport and other organizations related to the UK rail industry, featuring expert analysis and case studies alongside interviews from the biggest names in rail in its monthly magazine and on its website alongside commentary from professionals that work in the railway industry in the United Kingdom and around the world.

The current editor is Sam Sherwood-Hale.

Freight wars
In September 2009, freight operator First GB Railfreight issued a 'clarification' on its website after an unguarded comment by its managing director John Smith, reported in Rail Professional, appeared to make a flippant reference to lifespan of one of his rivals. In an article celebrating ten years of GBRF, there was some discussion of the difficulties faced by the freight industry and the tendency of Keith Heller, the then head of the UK's largest rail freight carrier DB Schenker, to be outspoken on such matters. John Smith is quoted as saying: 'Someone does need to say these things, but I think he's pissing in the wind. The same with longer trains, which he also talks about. But Keith's 60, he'll certainly be dead before anything changes!'

After the article was published, a clarification appeared on First GBRf's website saying: 'The context of the remarks were made in reference to the frustrations and difficulties the freight industry faces compared to the passenger sector and John's remarks were intended to highlight the length of time it can take for freight issues to be addressed, as opposed to any slight on Keith himself.'

See also
 List of railroad-related periodicals

References

External links
 

1996 establishments in the United Kingdom
Magazines established in 1996
Monthly magazines published in the United Kingdom
Professional and trade magazines